Lumberjanes is a comic book series created by Shannon Watters, Grace Ellis, Gus Allen, and ND Stevenson and published via the Boom Box! imprint of Boom! Studios. The story follows a group of girls named Mal, Ripley, Molly, April, and Jo spending summer at a scout camp, and the strange creatures and supernatural phenomena they encounter there. Originally planned as an eight-part series, the comic was made an ongoing series following strong sales and critical acclaim. The comic series came to a close after 75 issues with a one-shot finale in December 2020, ending its six-year-run.

Publication history
Lumberjanes came about as the result of Boom! Studios editor Shannon Watters approaching writer Grace Ellis in the hopes of creating a girl-centric comic series. After settling on a story set at a summer camp, the pair brought in Gus Allen for initial character designs and ND Stevenson as a co-writer. The series would be the second published on Boom! Studios' Boom! Box imprint, which aimed to feature experimental, creator-driven work by writers and artists from outside the mainstream comics industry. A single eight-issue story arc was originally planned, but shortly after the release of the second issue, Boom! Studios announced that Lumberjanes would become an ongoing series. The Lumberjanes characters were featured in a six-part crossover with DC Comics's Gotham Academy in June 2016.

Overview
The story is set in and around Miss Qiunzella Thiskwin Penniquiqul Thistle Crumpet's Camp for Girls Hardcore Lady Types, a summer camp whose attendees are known as "Lumberjane Scouts". The five scouts of the Roanoke cabin — Jo, April, Molly, Mal and Ripley — witness a mysterious old woman transforming into a bear, and after following her into the woods, encounter a hostile pack of three-eyed supernatural foxes. As more three-eyed creatures start to appear, the girls task themselves with solving the mysteries surrounding the camp.

Over the course of the story, characters earn or refer to various Lumberjane scout badges. The characters frequently invoke the names of notable female pioneers, with phrases such as "Oh my Bessie Coleman!" and "What the Joan Jett?"  Each of the first seven issues ends with a track listing for a mixtape prepared by one of the characters.

Characters

Campers
 Jo is the most cool-headed and analytical member of the group. She is a transgender girl who is also Navajo. She acts as the de facto leader and specializes in the more mathematical puzzles the group faces, and is the most by-the-book of the scouts, knowing the Lumberjane pledge by heart. She has a strong bond with April, including a secret handshake. When Jen is absent, Jo is the most likely to worry about the safety of the group and attempt to rescue her friends.  In Vol. 10, "Parents' Day", she and April refer to each other's parents as "uncle", but it is not clarified whether they are related, or that this is meant to imply that their families are close friends.
 April has a flair for the dramatic and a love of puns, and habitually takes notes on the various puzzles the group encounters in her diary. Though outwardly the least physically imposing Lumberjane, she is revealed to be the strongest after successfully arm wrestling a giant living statue. She is also the fact-finder and knowledge base for most of their adventures, and is always ready to face the unknown. She is Jo's best friend, and was the first person Jo came out to. As of issue 73, she has every badge available to Lumberjanes.
 Molly is a skilled archer, but being shy, she sometimes worries that she doesn't contribute enough to the group. However, it is revealed that she has a head for word games and puzzles, and likes to read, loves history, and has the second-most patches of anyone.  While Jo or April take the lead and forge ahead, Molly will watch the back of the group, preferring to look after Mal (often anxious), or Ripley (often distracted). She has a raccoon companion named Bubbles whom she wears as a hat and has a mutual crush on Mal. She has a rocky relationship with her family, particularly her mother, while her relationship with her father appears to be relatively neutral.
 Mal, despite her punk appearance, is the most cautious and sensitive of the group. She is Korean-American. She specializes in crafting elaborate plans. She is often paranoid about the dangers facing them at the camp, has a fear of rivers, lakes, and other bodies of water, and is watched over and protected by Molly, whom she loves romantically. They often hold hands and share panels together as a couple.
 Ripley is the youngest and most energetic of the girls, liable to launch herself towards danger without any fear. Her famous move includes drop-kicking things in the stomach, including foxes, yetis, statues, and even Mal, and she sometimes gets her friends to throw her at enemies. She loves animals, from kittens to dinosaurs, and sweet things such as cookies and candy. Despite often being the catalyst for trouble (forcing the others to follow her to rescue her from jumping into white water rapids, for example) she possesses keen insight into other people's feelings. Molly and Mal are often Ripley's unofficial guardians, and if not them, then Jen. She has a large family, and often bickers with her siblings. She is shown to have a very close relationship with her Abuela. She is half Irish-American and half Afro-Mexican.

Camp staff
 Jen is Roanoke cabin's scout-leader and is a student in high school. The girls consider her an adult figure, meaning that they are likely on the younger end of their teen years, though it is never specified. Though Jen takes her job very seriously and is often stern with her campers, she genuinely cares for them and tries to protect them from harm. She is extremely knowledgeable about various fields such as botany and astronomy, and usually tries in vain to interest her adventurous campers in safer activities before catching on to the odd happenings at Camp.
 Rosie is the camp scout-master, an easy-going, tattooed woman who enjoys woodcarving (and by dress, tattoos, name, and hobbies, is an obvious nod to Rosie the Riveter, playing into the theme of "Hardcore Lady Types" and feminist empowerment). She seems to know more about the mysterious events surrounding the camp than she is willing to reveal, and encourages the Lumberjanes to keep their eyes peeled, tacitly encouraging them to solve the mystery.

Collected editions

Novels
Author Mariko Tamaki and artist Gus Allen expanded the series into a four-book series of middle-grade novels, published by Amulet Books:

1. Unicorn Power! (3 October 2017)
2. The Moon Is Up (8 May 2018)
3. The Good Egg (30 October 2018)
4. Ghost Cabin (10 September 2019)

Original graphic novels
Boom! Box released a series of original graphic novels, written by Lilah Sturges and drawn by polterink:

1. The Infernal Compass (23 October 2018)
2. The Shape of Friendship (26 November 2019)
3. True Colors (20 October 2020)

Reception
Lumberjanes launched to positive reviews. Many reviewers commented on the importance of the comic as an all-ages, female-led and female-authored title. Alison Berry of Comicosity said that "Lumberjanes is the book that so many have asked for, both accessible and girl friendly without sacrificing entertainment value for the older set... Girls doing for girls is important in comics especially, because it is traditionally dominated by male characters and creators." 
Mey Rude of Autostraddle praised issue 17 of the comic where Jo, a "girl of color with two dads", talks about how she is a trans girl, and how it will affect other trans youth. She added that representation like Jo gives kids an opportunity to see themselves in a new light, calling her appearance and role in the comic "something radical", while wondering what this would mean for then-"upcoming Lumberjanes movie", later turned into a series. Caitlin Chappell of CBR argued that the comic easily appeals to kids who like Scooby-Doo, Gravity Falls, and Adventure Time. She further argued that the cast includes several LGBTQ characters like Jo, a de facto leader and trans girl, while saying that Molly and Mal are an "adorable couple." At the same time, she stated that those behind the creation of the series not only talk about the "wonder of camp", but prove that "accepting queer identities should be the norm for children and adults." Finally, Tina Howard of Teen Vogue pointed to "queer leads" in the comics as a whole. She specifically stated that the series writes "LGBT stories that are completely appropriate for young people", while calling it funny, smart, and noting that "features queer and trans young women". She also called it "vital for LGBT kids".

Academic theses were more critical. In her Masters of Arts Thesis, Tiffany Mumm noted that Lumberjanes shows that those who are bullied do not have to "resort to kindness to solve their issues" as is the case with April in an issue within vol. 1, by proving bullies wrong and silencing those people. However, Monica Lafaire Mejia went further and talked about "feminist friendships" in Lumberjanes. She argued that it has the potential to "challenge the representation of heteronormative relations and traditional gender roles", adding that the friendships are a "feminist site of resistance". She compared the comic to Buffy the Vampire Slayer, stated that it normalizes "feminist sensibilities in U.S. popular culture", that those working on the series are going "against the majority male lead stories in comics" and is part of the changing of the comic industry. She further argued that the comic challenges the assumption that a heterosexual couple is the only place "caregiving and intimacy occurs". She called the visual style of the comics akin to cartoons on Disney XD and Cartoon Network while questioning the gender binary and portraying a "queer living community", with all the leading female characters disrupt "a uniform female representation in popular culture", celebrating the differences between them. At the same time, Meija stated that the comic criticizes toxic masculinity through the director of the camp of male scouts. She said it emphasizes the need of non-binary people and women to maintain "friendships on their own right", rather than in relation to men, while the comic has "clear visual and verbal links" to feminism. However, she points that while the comic creates a space free of heteronormativity it avoids "critical engagement" with other forms of oppression like colonialism and racism, even as it tries to reclaim figures from the American frontier, while highlighting the growing relationship between Molly and Mal, noting that Jo is a trans girl, and that Barney is non-binary. As such, she argues, the comic places gender "within a settler colonial narrative...blurring intersecting oppressions", making them invisible, saying the absence of Native Americans and use of "frontier imagery", ends up reproducing the "settler colonial narrative".

The series has a rapidly growing fanbase, and at the Staple Comic Con in Austin Texas on March 7, 2015, the regular artist of the series, Gus Allen, said that the official name for fans of the series is "Lumber Jumbies" and that he hopes the fans take to this name, with Ellis accepting this label.
Two days later, Allen stated that "lumberjumbie is a gender neutral term" after being asked by a fan about it. The following year, the Lumberjanes Twitter account used the term in promoting a new Boom! Studios series titled The Backstagers.

Awards and nominations
In 2015, Lumberjanes was nominated and won two Eisner Awards, for Best New Series and Best Publication for Teens; In 2015, it was also nominated for the GLAAD Media Award for Outstanding Comic Book. It was nominated for the GLAAD Outstanding Comic Book in 2018 and 2019.

Animated adaptation
As of May 2015, 20th Century Fox was working on a live-action adaptation. In August 2016, Emily Carmichael was announced to direct the film. In August 2019, the film was canceled by Disney after its acquisition of 21st Century Fox. In October 2020, HBO Max won a bid against Apple and Peacock to release an animated television adaptation of the series. The one-hour animated special introducing the characters will be executive produced and written by ND Stevenson. He will also write and direct episodes for the main series, while serving an executive producer. Additionally, Ross Richie and Stephen Christy, from BOOM! Studios, will be executive producers, as will Mette Norkjaer, Shannon Watters, Grace Ellis, and Gus Allen. After the adaptation was announced, fellow animators, like Matt Braly of Amphibia, Rad Sechrist of Kipo and the Age of Wonderbeasts, Aaron Waltke of Tales of Arcadia, Shadi Petosky of Twelve Forever and Danger & Eggs praised the development. There were similar sentiments from voice actors Liam O'Brien, Sam Riegel, Aimee Carrero, Felicia Day, and Cissy Jones, comic artists Alex Z. Zhang and Victoria Ying, TV writers Shane Lynch and Benjamin Siemon, and comic writers Jackson Lanzing and Dan Slott, among others. 

In October 22, 2020, Stevenson stated that the show is in "development, not production" and that there is "no crew at this time." In January 2021, Gumroad said that Stevenson is "steering" the animated Lumberjanes adaptation. as did Morgan Shaunette of CBR. In 2021, Out,  ITV, and Polygon described the series as in development, noting the role of Stevenson. In December 2022, Multiversity Comics reported that they were "still waiting for the Lumberjanes TV show", with no news in 2022. As of February 2023, no news about the series has been announced, with HBO Max remaining silent on the series possible release.

References

GLAAD Media Award for Outstanding Comic Book winners
2014 comics debuts
2010s LGBT literature
Boom! Studios titles
Comics about women
Fantasy comics
LGBT-related comics
Lesbian-related comics
Transgender-related comics
Scouting in popular culture